Erica Durance (born June 21, 1978) is a Canadian actress known for her roles as Lois Lane on the superhero television series Smallville (2004–2011) and as Dr. Alex Reid on the medical drama series Saving Hope (2012–2017). She had a recurring role as Alura Zor-El on the Arrowverse superhero series Supergirl (2017–2019) and has also appeared in films such as The Butterfly Effect 2 (2006), Wedding Planner Mystery (2014), Painkillers (2015) and Color My World With Love (2022).

Early life
Durance was born in Calgary to parents Gail and Joel Durance, and grew up on a turkey farm with her older brother and sister in Three Hills, Alberta, Canada. She was trained as a classical singer from childhood. After graduating from high school, Durance moved to Vancouver in 1999, to pursue her interest in acting professionally. She continued to study acting at the Yaletown Actors Studio for many years with her coach and husband, David Palffy.

Career
Durance began her career with background work, graduating to commercials and guest-starring roles. Durance made her feature film debut in the movie The Untold (2002). She guest-starred on the comedy series The Chris Isaak Show and the supernatural series The Collector. In Tru Calling, her character was a contender in a beauty pageant opposite Eliza Dushku. On the SyFy Channel, she played an intergalactic librarian in Andromeda and a love interest for Teal'c on Stargate SG-1.

While acting part-time, Durance worked as an agent for background actors and booked photo doubles for the television series Smallville. Durance was considering quitting acting when she was cast as Lois Lane on Smallville in 2004. She played a sassy, street-smart teenage Lois in season four. Producer Kelly Souders recalled hiring Durance, stating: "There were a lot of wonderful actresses who came in for the role, but I remember sitting and watching her tape and everybody was like, 'That’s her. There's no question'." Souders also noted that "Lois has to be one of the most difficult characters to play, because she's super-opinionated, extremely bright and a little abrupt, and at the same time she has to be likable." Fellow producer Brian Peterson added that from the moment Durance was hired they knew she would be Lois for the series. Durance was promoted to series regular in season five and became part of the regular cast for the remainder of the series run. On playing Lois Lane Durance said: "Everyone has their specific idea of who Lois Lane is for them, and you have your overall blueprint, but then you have to try to make it your own. That's the only way to try to stay truthful to what you're doing. It's an experience I will cherish always and never forget. Lois is a beloved character. I took that seriously and put my heart and soul into her for seven years. I enjoyed every minute and am forever changed by it."

Durance appeared in the films The Butterfly Effect 2 (2006) and Island Heat: Stranded (2006). She was nominated for a Gemini Awards for the Lifetime movie I Me Wed (2007). She starred as Maid Marian in Beyond Sherwood Forest (2009) and appeared in the film Sophie and Sheba (2010) as an Aerial silk performer in the circus. In 2011, she guests starred in the television series Charlie's Angels as CIA operative Samantha Masters. She played twin sisters Angela and Christine in the Italian TV mini-series 6 passi nel giallo and appeared in the NBC series Harry's Law in 2012.

In June 2012, Durance began starring in the lead role in the CTV medical drama television series Saving Hope, as Chief Surgical Dr. Alex Reid. She was also a producer on the series and directed the season four episode "Torn and Frayed". In season 3, Durance's real-life pregnancy was worked into her character Alex Reid and the series. Saving Hope ended its run in 2017.

Durance starred in the Hallmark Movies & Mysteries channel movie Wedding Planner Mystery (2014). The movie is based on Deborah Donnelly's novel Veiled Threats and was supposed to be the first film in the channel's Mystery Wheel series adaptation. In 2015, she appeared in the thriller film Painkillers with Tahmoh Penikett.

Durance appeared in The CW television series Supergirl in a recurring role as Kara's Kryptonian mother, Alura Zor-El, and as Agent Noel Neill in the episode "Midvale". Durance and her Smallville co-star Tom Welling reprised their roles as Lois and Clark in the Batwoman episode of the 2019 Arrowverse crossover event "Crisis on Infinite Earths".

In 2022, Durance was cast in the Lifetime film Girl in the Shed: The Kidnapping of Abby Hernandez, which tells the real-life story the abduction of a 14 year old and how she survived against all odds. Part of the network's "Ripped from the Headlines" feature films, Durance portrays Abby's mother Zenya.

Durance played Emma, the mother of a talented artist with Down syndrome in Color My World With Love (2022), a groundbreaking Hallmark Movies & Mysteries original movie centred on a love story featuring two leading characters with Down syndrome.

Charity work
Durance is a supporter of World Vision Canada. In August 2006, she co-hosted the Superman/Batman #26 art auction at the Wizard World Chicago convention, with comic book writer and Smallville producer Jeph Loeb. Durance refused her appearance fee and donated the money towards the auction. The auction raised $70,000. The event honored Loeb's son, Sam Loeb, who died at age 17 after a long battle with bone cancer, and all of its proceeds went to the Sam Loeb College Scholarship Fund.

Accolades
Durance was ranked No. 38 on FHM magazine's "100 Sexiest Women in the World" in 2006 and #20 in 2007, #15 in 2008, and #14 in 2009. She has also appeared on the cover of FHM and Maxim magazine. In 2009, Durance was on Entertainment Weekly'''s Sci-fi Hotties Women. BuddyTV ranked her #26 on its TV's 100 Sexiest Women of 2009, and #16 on its 2010 list. In 2012, BuddyTV ranked Durance #9 on their list of Summer 2012's Sexiest Stars. Hello!'' magazine listed her as one of Canada's 50 Most Beautiful People in 2012.

Personal life
Durance was married to Wesley Parker from 1996 to 1999. She began dating Canadian actor David Palffy in 2001 and married him in 2005. In September 2014, Durance revealed she was pregnant with the couple's first child and gave birth to a boy in February 2015. Durance announced she was pregnant with her second child in June 2016. Her second son was born in December 2016. She also has a stepson from her husband's previous relationship. Durance and her husband reside in Vancouver, British Columbia.

Filmography

Film

Television

Producer

Director

Awards and nominations

References

External links

 
 Erica Durance at Instagram 
 Erica Durance at Twitter
 Erica Durance at TV Guide
 Erica Durance at BuddyTV

1978 births
Actresses from Calgary
Canadian expatriate actresses in the United States
Canadian film actresses
Canadian television actresses
Living people
People from Kneehill County
21st-century Canadian actresses